Eileen Perrier (born 1974) is a British portrait photographer, living in London. She has had solo exhibitions at Whitechapel Gallery and The Photographers' Gallery, London. Perrier's work is held in the collections of Tate, Light Work and the Parliament of the United Kingdom.

Early life and education
Perrier was born and raised in London. She is of Ghanaian and Dominican descent. She graduated from Surrey Institute of Art and Design in 1996 and from the Royal College of Art in 2000.

Life and work
"Her practice includes sitters encountered through various strategies; such as their occupation; location or a physical trait."

Perrier is a senior lecturer in Photography and between 2019 and 2021 was trustee of The Photographers' Gallery, London.

She lives in London.

Publications

Books of work by Perrier
Eileen Perrier: Monograph. London: Autograph ABP, 1997. .
Eileen Perrier. Nottingham: Angel Row Gallery, 2003. . With an essay by Deborah Dean. Exhibition catalogue.

Books of work with one other
The Two of Us. London: Autograph, 1999. With Ann-Marie Lequesne. .

Books with contributions by Perrier
Blink: 100 photographers, 10 curators, 10 writers. New York: Phaidon, 2002. 2004, .

Solo exhibitions
Eileen Perrier: Wentworth Street Studios, Whitechapel Gallery commission, 2009
Brixton Studio, The Photographers' Gallery, London, 2002

Collections
Perrier's work is held in the following permanent collections:
Tate, London
Light Work, Syracuse, New York
Parliament of the United Kingdom: her photograph of member of parliament Patricia Gibson

References

External links
 

Living people
1974 births
20th-century British photographers
21st-century British photographers
20th-century English women artists
21st-century English women artists
Academics of the University of Westminster
Alumni of the University for the Creative Arts
Alumni of the Royal College of Art
British portrait photographers
Photographers from London